Yannick Tuason (born January 4, 1989) is a Filipino footballer who plays as a striker for Philippines Football League (PFL) club Stallion Laguna and the Philippines national team. He played college football for the University of Santo Tomas in the UAAP and began his professional career with Kaya in 2008.

Career

Club career
He then transfers to PSG at the middle of 2013 United Football League season.

He is part of the Maharlika Manila squad for the 2020 Philippines Football League season.

International career 

Tuason was called up for the Philippine team since late 2010. He made his international debut as a substitute to winger Emelio Caligdong during the  2012 AFC Challenge Cup qualifiers against Myanmar.

In November 2017, After his 6 years absence in the national team, Tuason was included in the Philippines squad for 2017 CTFA International Tournament in Taiwan.

References

External links 
Yannick Tuason profile at Kaya FC

Living people
Filipino people of Chinese descent
Filipino footballers
1989 births
University Athletic Association of the Philippines footballers
Footballers from Metro Manila
Sportspeople from Manila
Pasargad F.C. players
Kaya F.C. players
Stallion Laguna F.C. players
Philippines international footballers
University of Santo Tomas alumni
Association football forwards